The Battle of Preveza was a naval battle that took place on 28 September 1538 near Preveza in Ionian Sea in northwestern Greece between an Ottoman fleet and that of a Holy League assembled by Pope Paul III. It occurred in the same area in the Ionian Sea as the Battle of Actium, 31 BC. It was one of the three largest sea battles that took place in the sixteenth century Mediterranean, along with the Battle of Djerba and the Battle of Lepanto. In this battle, the Ottomans defeated the Europeans.

Background

In 1537, commanding a large Ottoman fleet, Hayreddin Barbarossa captured a number of Aegean and Ionian islands belonging to the Republic of Venice, namely Syros, Aegina, Ios, Paros, Tinos, Karpathos, Kasos, and Naxos, thus annexing the Duchy of Naxos to the Ottoman Empire. He then unsuccessfully besieged the Venetian stronghold of Corfu and ravaged the Spanish-held Calabrian coast in southern Italy.

In the face of this threat, Pope Paul III in February 1538 in assembled a ’’Holy League’’, comprising the Papal States, Habsburg Spain, the Republic of Genoa, the Republic of Venice, and the Knights of Malta, to confront Ottoman fleet under Barbarossa.

Forces
Barbarossa's fleet that summer numbered 122 galleys and galliots. That of the Holy League comprised 300 galleys and galleons (55 Venetian galleys, 61 Genoese-Papal, 10 sent by the Knights Hospitaller, and 50 by the Spanish). Andrea Doria, the Genoese admiral in the service of Emperor Charles V was in overall command.

Deployment

The Holy League assembled its fleet near the island of Corfu. The Papal fleet under Admiral Marco Grimani, Patriarch of Aquileia and the Venetian fleet under Vincenzo Capello arrived first. Andrea Doria joined them with the Spanish-Genoese fleet on 22 September 1538.

Prior to Doria's arrival, Grimani attempted to land troops near the Fortress of Preveza, but he retreated to Corfu after suffering a number of casualties in the ensuing encounter with Ottoman forces.  

Barbarossa was still at the island of Kos in the Aegean Sea at that time, but he soon arrived at Preveza with the rest of the Ottoman fleet, after capturing the island of Kefalonia on the way. Sinan Reis, one of his lieutenants, suggested landing troops at Actium on the Gulf of Arta near Preveza, an idea that Barbarossa initially opposed, but which later proved to be important in securing the Ottoman victory. With the Turks holding the fortress at Actium, they could support Barbarossa's fleet with artillery fire from there, while Doria had to keep his ships away from the coast. A Christian landing to take Actium probably would have been needed to ensure success, but Doria was fearful of a defeat on land after the initial sortie by Grimani had been repelled. Two more attempts by the Holy League to land their forces, this time near the fortress of Preveza at the opposite shore facing Actium, were repulsed by the forces of Murat Reis on 25 and 26 September.

As Doria's ships kept their distance from the coast, much concerned about adverse winds driving them onto a hostile shore, Barbarossa had the advantageous interior position. During the night of 27–28 September, Doria therefore sailed 30 miles south and, when the wind died down, anchored at Sessola near the island of Lefkada. During the night, he and his commanders decided that their best option was to stage an attack towards Lepanto and force Barbarossa to fight.

The battle
 
At dawn, however, Doria was surprised to see that the Turks were coming towards his ships. Barbarossa had taken his fleet out of the anchorage and headed south as well. Turgut Reis was in the van with six large fustas, and the left wing closely hugged the shore. Not expecting such a daring offensive from the numerically inferior Ottoman fleet, it took Doria three hours to give the order to weigh anchor and ready for battle—pressed by Grimani and Capello.

The two fleets finally engaged on 28 September 1538 in the Gulf of Arta, near Preveza.

The lack of wind was not in Doria's favor. The huge Venetian flagship Galeone di Venezia with her massive guns was becalmed four miles from land and ten miles from Sessola. While the Christian ships struggled to come to her assistance, she was soon surrounded by enemy galleys and engaged in a furious battle that lasted hours and did much damage to the Ottoman galleys.

When the wind rose, the Christian fleet finally approached the action, although Doria first executed a number of maneuvres designed to draw the Turks out to sea. Ferrante Gonzaga, the Viceroy of Sicily, was at the left wing of the combined fleet, while the Maltese Knights were at the right wing. Doria placed four of his fastest galleys under the command of his nephew Giovanni Andrea Doria who was positioned in the center front, between Gonzaga and the Maltese Knights. Doria's galleys formed a long line behind them, in front of the Papal and Venetian galleys of Grimani and Capello. In the rear were the Venetian galleons under the command of Alessandro Condalmiero (Bondumier) and the Spanish-Portuguese-Genoese galleons under the command of Francesco Doria, together with the barques and support ships.

The Ottoman fleet had a Y shaped configuration: Barbarossa, together with his son Hasan Reis (later Hasan Pasha), Sinan Reis, Cafer Reis, and Şaban Reis, was at the center; Seydi Ali Reis commanded the left wing; Salih Reis commanded the right wing; while Turgut Reis, accompanied by Murat Reis, Güzelce Mehmet Reis, and Sadık Reis, commanded the rear wing. The Turks swiftly engaged the Venetian, Papal, and Maltese ships, but Doria hesitated to bring his center into action against Barbarossa, which led to much tactical maneuvering but little fighting. Barbarossa wanted to take advantage of the lack of wind which immobilized the Christian barques, which accounted for most of the numerical difference between the two sides. These barques fell as easy prey to the Turks, who boarded them from their relatively more mobile galleys and galliots. Doria's efforts to trap the Ottoman ships between the cannon fire of his barques and galleys failed.

At the end of the day, the Turks sunk, destroyed or captured 128 ships and had taken about 3,000 prisoners. The Turks did not lose any ships but suffered 400 dead and 800 wounded. A number of Ottoman ships had been seriously damaged, however, by the cannon fire of the massive Galeone di Venezia, the Venetian flagship under the command of Alessandro Condalmiero.

The next morning, with favorable wind, and unwilling to risk the Spanish-Genoese ships, Doria set sail and left the battlefield for Corfu, deaf to the pleas of the Venetian, Papal, and Maltese commanders to continue the fight.

Aftermath

It is widely speculated that Doria's prevarication and lack of zeal were due to his unwillingness to risk his own ships (he personally owned a substantial number of the "Spanish-Genoese" fleet) and his long-standing enmity towards Venice, his home city's fierce rival and the primary target of Ottoman aggression at that time.

In 1539 Barbarossa returned and captured almost all the remaining Christian outposts in the Ionian and Aegean Seas.

A peace treaty was signed between Venice and the Ottoman Empire in October 1540, under which the Turks took control of the Venetian possessions in the Morea and in Dalmatia and of the formerly Venetian islands in the Aegean, Ionian, and eastern Adriatic Seas. Venice also had to pay a war indemnification of 300,000 ducats of gold to the Ottoman Empire.

With the victory at Preveza and the subsequent victory in the Battle of Djerba in 1560, the Ottomans succeeded in repulsing the efforts of Venice and Spain, the two principal rival powers in the Mediterranean, to stop their drive for controlling the sea. The Ottoman supremacy in large-scale fleet battles in the Mediterranean Sea remained unchallenged until the Battle of Lepanto in 1571.

Nicolò Zen the younger wrote his History of the War between Venice and the Turks which primarily consisted of an invective against those who had called for the war against the Ottomans in which they had behaved so ingloriously. The text was not published but a manuscript of it was circulated in his household and survived and is now held by the Biblioteca Marciana.

Notes

References

Sources

External links
Battle of Preveza (1538) - An in-depth Analysis

Conflicts in 1538
Naval battles of the Ottoman–Venetian Wars
Naval battles involving Spain
Ottoman–Spanish conflicts
Preveza
Battle of Preveza
Ionian Sea
16th century in Greece
Naval battles involving the Knights Hospitaller
1538 in the Ottoman Empire
Naval battles involving the Ottoman Empire